This is a list of settlements in the Grevena regional unit, Greece.

 Agalaioi
 Agapi
 Agioi Theodoroi
 Agios Georgios, Grevena
 Agios Georgios, Deskati
 Agios Kosmas 
 Aidonia
 Aimilianos
 Alatopetra
 Amygdalies
 Anavryta
 Ano Ekklisia
 Anoixi
 Anthrakia
 Asprokampos 
 Avdella
 Dasaki
 Dasochori
 Dasyllio 
 Deskati
 Despotis
 Diasellaki
 Dimitra
 Diporo
 Dotsiko
 Doxaras
 Ekklisia
 Elatos
 Elefthero
 Eleftherochori
 Elefthero Prosfygon
 Exarchos
 Felli
 Filippaioi
 Gilofos
 Grevena
 Itea
 Kalamitsi
 Kalirachi
 Kallithea
 Kalloni 
 Kalochi
 Karpero
 Kastro
 Katakali
 Kentro
 Kipoureio
 Kivotos
 Klimataki
 Knidi
 Kokkinia
 Kosmati
 Kranea
 Kydonies
 Kyparissi
 Kyrakali
 Lavdas
 Leipsi
 Mavranaioi
 Mavronoros
 Megalo Seirini
 Megaro
 Mesolakkos
 Mesolouri
 Mikro Seirini
 Mikrokleisoura
 Mikrolivado
 Milea
 Monachiti
 Myrsina
 Nea Trapezounta
 Neochori
 Nisi
 Oropedio
 Palaiochori
 Paliouria
 Panagia
 Panorama
 Paraskevi
 Perivolaki
 Perivoli
 Pigaditsa
 Pistiko
 Polydendro
 Polyneri
 Pontini
 Poros
 Prionia
 Prosvorro
 Pyloroi
 Rodia
 Samarina
 Sarakina
 Sitaras
 Smixi
 Spilaio
 Stavros
 Syndendro
 Taxiarchis
 Trifylli 
 Trikokkia
 Trikomo
 Trikorfo 
 Varis
 Vatolakkos
 Zakas

By municipality

See also
Slavic toponyms of places in Grevena Prefecture
List of towns and villages in Greece

Grevena